Aimé Fritz (April 23, 1884 – January 28, 1950) was an American cyclist. He competed in the men's half mile event at the 1904 Summer Olympics.

References

External links
 

1884 births
1950 deaths
American male cyclists
Olympic cyclists of the United States
Cyclists at the 1904 Summer Olympics
People from Alsace-Lorraine
German emigrants to the United States
American people of German descent